ZCL may refer to:

 General Leobardo C. Ruiz International Airport with IATA symbol ZCL .
 Zonal constructed language